Wilton is a census-designated place (CDP) in Sacramento County, California, United States. It is part of the Sacramento–Arden-Arcade–Roseville Metropolitan Statistical Area. The population was 5,363 at the 2010 census, up from 4,551 at the 2000 census.

Geography and environment
Wilton is located at  (38.409556, -121.224264).

Historically the Wilton vicinity has been a locale of considerable haying and pasture usage; the depth to groundwater is typically about 150 to 175 feet (46 to 53 meters).

Wilton lies partially in the floodplain of the Cosumnes River. Because some areas of Wilton are in a flood zone, water can be in the streets during the rainy season. In 1997, an El Nino/La Nina year, levees broke and some homes were flooded to the rooftops. On New Years Eve of 2022, parts of Wilton were evacuated due to a flood warning after levee breaches on the Cosumnes River.

Demographics

2010
The 2010 United States Census reported that Wilton had a population of 5,363. The racial makeup of Wilton was 2,234 (78.9%) White, 169 (3.2%) African American, 45 (0.8%) Native American, 289 (5.4%) Asian, 13 (0.2%) Pacific Islander, 343 (6.4%) from other races, and 270 (5.0%) from two or more races. Hispanic or Latino of any race were 683 persons (12.7%).

The Census reported that 3,341 people (99.6% of the population) lived in households, 16 (0.3%) lived in non-institutionalized group quarters, and 6 (0.1%) were institutionalized.

There were 1,865 households, out of which 613 (32.9%) had children under the age of 18 living in them, 1,281 (68.7%) were opposite-sex married couples living together, 130 (7.0%) had a female householder with no husband present, 84 (4.5%) had a male householder with no wife present.  There were 66 (3.5%) unmarried opposite-sex partnerships, and 17 (0.9%) same-sex married couples or partnerships. 284 households (15.2%) were made up of individuals, and 124 (6.6%) had someone living alone who was 65 years of age or older. The average household size was 2.86.  There were 1,495 families (80.2% of all households); the average family size was 3.18.

The population was spread out, with 1,240 people (23.1%) under the age of 18, 416 people (7.8%) aged 18 to 24, 975 people (18.2%) aged 25 to 44, 1,879 people (35.0%) aged 45 to 64, and 853 people (15.9%) who were 65 years of age or older.  The median age was 45.5 years. For every 100 females, there were 98.9 males.  For every 100 females age 18 and over, there were 98.2 males.

The homeowner vacancy rate was 2.2%; the rental vacancy rate was 5.0%.  4,646 people (86.6% of the population) lived in owner-occupied housing units and 695 people (13.0%) lived in rental housing units.

2000
As of the census of 2000, there were 4,551 people, 1,519 households, and 1,277 families residing in the CDP. The racial makeup of the CDP was 85.21% White, 1.89% African American, 1.21% Native American, 2.35% Asian, 0.20% Pacific Islander, 3.63% from other races, and 5.52% from two or more races. Hispanic or Latino of any race were 9.67% of the population.

There were 1,519 households, out of which 33.6% had children under the age of 18 living with them, 74.6% were married couples living together, 6.2% had a female householder with no husband present, and 15.9% were non-families. 11.3% of all households were made up of individuals, and 4.3% had someone living alone who was 65 years of age or older.  The average household size was 2.97 and the average family size was 3.20.

In the CDP, the population was spread out, with 26.0% under the age of 18, 6.1% from 18 to 24, 24.1% from 25 to 44, 32.2% from 45 to 64, and 11.6% who were 65 years of age or older.  The median age was 42 years. For every 100 females, there were 102.9 males.  For every 100 females age 18 and over, there were 97.9 males.

The median income for a household in the CDP was $68,774, and the median income for a family was $76,111. Males had a median income of $54,028 versus $40,650 for females. The per capita income for the CDP was $28,568.  About 2.8% of families and 3.9% of the population were below the poverty line, including 4.4% of those under age 18 and 3.3% of those over 64.

Politics
In the state legislature Wilton is in the 1st Senate District, represented by Republican Ted Gaines, and in the 8th Assembly District, represented by Democrat Ken Cooley.

Bibliography

External links

Census-designated places in Sacramento County, California
Census-designated places in California